Azygophleps regia is a moth in the  family Cossidae found in Turkey, Pakistan, Iran and Iraq.

References

Moths described in 1891
Azygophleps
Moths of Asia